Oscar Haskell Morris (1876-1939) was an American journalist and politician who represented the 4th district of the Wisconsin State Senate from 1921 to 1938. He was a Republican. Born in Springfield, Massachusetts on March 8, 1876, he was editor and publisher of trade journals and was involved in retail and commerce. Morris died on January 2, 1939, in Shorewood, Wisconsin and was succeeded by fellow Republican Milton T. Murray.

References

External links
The Political Graveyard

Republican Party Wisconsin state senators
1876 births
1939 deaths
Journalists from Wisconsin
Politicians from Springfield, Massachusetts
Politicians from Milwaukee
Businesspeople from Wisconsin
Businesspeople from Springfield, Massachusetts